Gabriel Nicu Giurgiu (born 3 September 1982) is a Romanian football official and a former player. He is the sporting director for Universitatea Cluj. In his career Giurgiu also played for teams such as Universitatea Cluj, Oțelul Galați or Maccabi Netanya, among others.

Club career
Giurgiu started his senior career in Universitatea Cluj. In January 2007, he signed up in Oțelul Galați. After a series of good performances he was transferred to Rubin Kazan during the summer break in 2007. A few months later, in January 2008, he was loaned back to Oțelul until the end of the season. In May, he returned to Rubin. In January 2009, he completed his return to Oțelul Galați.

International career
Giurgiu made his debut for the Romania national team at the age of 28 in 2011 in a friendly game against Brazil.

International stats

Honours

Universitatea Cluj
Liga III: 2000–01, 2017–18
Liga IV – Cluj County: 2016–17

Oțelul Galați
UEFA Intertoto Cup: 2007
Liga I: 2010–11
Supercupa României: 2011

Rubin Kazan
Russian Premier League: 2008

Concordia Chiajna
Cupa Ligii runner-up: 2015–16

References

External links
 
 
 

1982 births
Living people
Sportspeople from Cluj-Napoca
Romanian footballers
Romania international footballers
Association football midfielders
Liga I players
Liga II players
Liga III players
FC Universitatea Cluj players
ASC Oțelul Galați players
CS Concordia Chiajna players
Victoria Cluj players
Russian Premier League players
FC Rubin Kazan players
Israeli Premier League players
Maccabi Netanya F.C. players
Romanian expatriate footballers
Romanian expatriate sportspeople in Russia
Expatriate footballers in Russia
Romanian expatriate sportspeople in Israel
Expatriate footballers in Israel